John Henery was an English professional footballer who played as an outside left in the Football League for Brentford and Darlington.

Career 
Henery began his career with North Eastern League club Houghton Rovers, before competitive football was suspended due to the outbreak of the First World War in 1914. After the war, he joined Southern League First Division club Brentford towards the end of the 1919–20 season and made one appearance. He was retained the 1920–21 season, which would be the Griffin Park club's first in the Football League. Henery made 21 appearances and scored one goal during 1920–21, before being released at the end of the season and returning to his native northeast to join Third Division North club Darlington.

Career statistics

References

English footballers
Footballers from Sunderland
Darlington F.C. players
Brentford F.C. players
English Football League players
Year of death missing
Southern Football League players
Year of birth missing
Association football outside forwards
Association football midfielders